El Clavo is a town in the state of Miranda, Venezuela. 

Populated places in Miranda (state)